Hélder Esteves (born 1 July 1977) is a Portuguese former football striker and current manager.

Coaching career
After retiring in the summer 2016, Esteves became manager of Annecy FC, after having played as a playing assistant manager for the last two years. In May 2019, it was announced that Esteves had decided to resign. Esteves was manager of Thonon Évian F.C. in Championnat National 3 from October 2020 until May 2021.

References

External links 
 
 

Living people
1977 births
Association football forwards
Portuguese footballers
US Lusitanos Saint-Maur players
AJ Auxerre players
US Créteil-Lusitanos players
ES Troyes AC players
Dijon FCO players
FC Annecy players
Portuguese expatriate footballers
Expatriate footballers in France
Ligue 1 players
Ligue 2 players
FC Annecy managers
People from Bragança, Portugal
Sportspeople from Bragança District